David Lloyd Nelson (born 11 March 1967) is a male English former hurdler who competed in the 110 metres hurdles.

Athletics career
Nelson won a bronze medal for England, at the 1990 Commonwealth Games, and went on to achieve his career-best time of 13.42 secs in the heats of the 1991 World Championships, to qualify for the semifinals. This performance still ranks him in the UK all-time top ten. He also represented England, at the 1990 Commonwealth Games in Auckland, New Zealand.

Nelson won the 110m hurdles titles at the 1991 AAA Championships and the 1991 UK Championships.

International competitions

References

1967 births
World Athletics Championships athletes for Great Britain
British male hurdlers
Living people
Commonwealth Games medallists in athletics
Commonwealth Games bronze medallists for England
Athletes (track and field) at the 1986 Commonwealth Games
Athletes (track and field) at the 1990 Commonwealth Games
Medallists at the 1990 Commonwealth Games